Lieutenant-General Sir Hugh Sandham Jeudwine, KCB, KBE (9 June 1862 – 2 December 1942) was a British Army officer who became Director General of the Territorial Army.

Early life and education
Jeudwine was born at Chicheley, Buckinghamshire, on 9 June 1862. He was the son of Reverend William Jeudwine, vicar of Chicheley, Newport Pagnell. He was educated at Eton College between 1876 and 1880 before attending the Royal Military Academy, Woolwich from 1880 to 1882.

Military career

Jeudwine was commissioned into the Royal Artillery as a lieutenant on 22 February 1882, and was promoted to captain on 31 December 1890. He served in the Second Boer War 1899–1900, and was promoted to major on 4 January 1900. He again served in South Africa as Deputy Assistant Quartermaster General for Cape Colony in 1902. Following the end of the war in June 1902, he left Cape Town on the SS Canada and returned to Southampton in late July. After the war, he was appointed Assistant Superintendent of Experiments at the School of Gunnery in 1904 and Deputy Adjutant General at Aldershot Command in 1909 before taking a post on the staff at the Staff College, Camberley. He served in the First World War as Commander of 41st Infantry Brigade from 1915 and then as General Officer Commanding 55th (West Lancashire) Division from 1916. As Divisional Commander he sought feedback from his officers (an unusual practice at the time) at the Battle of Passchendaele in Autumn 1917 and then played a crucial role in holding the German Sixth Army at Givenchy in April 1918.

After the War he became Chief of General Staff at Headquarters British Army on the Rhine and then, from 1919, General Officer Commanding 5th Division in Ireland. His last appointment was as Director General of the Territorial Army in 1923 before he retired in 1927.

References

|-

1862 births
1942 deaths
Military personnel from Buckinghamshire
People educated at Eton College
Graduates of the Royal Military Academy, Woolwich
British Army generals of World War I
Knights Commander of the Order of the Bath
Knights Commander of the Order of the British Empire
Royal Artillery officers
British Army personnel of the Second Boer War
British Army lieutenant generals
Academics of the Staff College, Camberley